Blooming Prairie is a city in Dodge and Steele counties in the U.S. state of Minnesota.  The population was 1,996 at the 2010 census. Most of the city is located within Steele County; only a small part of the city extends into Dodge County.

History

Blooming Prairie was platted in 1868, taking the name of the surrounding Blooming Prairie Township, which was organized one year earlier. A post office has been in operation at Blooming Prairie since 1868. The city was incorporated by 1874.  Blooming Prairie's historic downtown is listed on the National Register of Historic Places.

Before the Prohibition Act came into effect, Blooming Prairie's presence near the intersection of Mower, Freeborn, Dodge, and Steele county made it a lucrative hub for the sale of alcohol according to the Mower County Historical Society. Circa 1917, Steele County was the only one of the four to be considered "wet", meaning it was legal to both own and consume alcohol, like in "dry" counties, but also legal to sell. During the Prohibition Act, several tunnels were dug under the businesses on Main Street for the purpose of making and peddling moonshine, according to many of the residents of Blooming Prairie.

Geography

U.S. Highway 218 and Minnesota State Highway 30 are the main routes in the city.

Demographics

2010 census
As of the census of 2010, there were 1,996 people, 802 households, and 535 families living in the city. The racial makeup of the city was 97.1% White, 0.4% African American, 0.3% Native American, 0.4% Asian, 0.6% from other races, and 1.3% from two or more races. Hispanic or Latino of any race were 6.3% of the population.

There were 802 households, of which 32.2% had children under the age of 18 living with them, 52.9% were married couples living together, 9.6% had a female householder with no husband present, 4.2% had a male householder with no wife present, and 33.3% were non-families. 28.6% of all households were made up of individuals, and 16.3% had someone living alone who was 65 years of age or older. The average household size was 2.42 and the average family size was 2.92.

The median age in the city was 40.5 years. 25.9% of residents were under the age of 18; 5.8% were between the ages of 18 and 24; 23.1% were from 25 to 44; 24.3% were from 45 to 64; and 21.2% were 65 years of age or older. The gender makeup of the city was 48.9% male and 51.1% female.

2000 census
As of the census of 2000, there were 1,933 people, 748 households, and 504 families living in the city. The racial makeup of the city was 96.43% White, 0.21% African American, 0.21% Native American, 0.36% Asian, 2.48% from other races, and 0.31% from two or more races. Hispanic or Latino of any race were 4.91% of the population.

Of the 748 households, 30.9% had children under the age of 18 living with them, 57.8% were married couples living together, 5.5% had a female householder with no husband present, and 32.5% were non-families. 28.2% of all households were made up of individuals, and 16.6% had someone living alone who was 65 years of age or older.  The average household size was 2.46 and the average family size was 3.02.

In the city, the population was spread out, with 25.7% under the age of 18, 7.5% from 18 to 24, 23.5% from 25 to 44, 20.2% from 45 to 64, and 23.0% who were 65 years of age or older.  The median age was 40 years. For every 100 females, there were 88.0 males.  For every 100 females age 18 and over, there were 88.0 males.

The median income for a household in the city was $40,345, and the median income for a family was $51,118. Males had a median income of $34,911 versus $21,705 for females. The per capita income for the city was $19,343.  About 2.8% of families and 6.6% of the population were below the poverty line, including 6.1% of those under age 18 and 9.8% of those age 65 or over.

Notable people
 Josh Braaten, actor, television's CSI: Miami, That 80's Show, Spin City, Married to the Kellys, among others, as well as several motion picture credits, including Dumb and Dumberer: When Harry Met Lloyd and Semi-Pro
 John George Lennon (1858-1919), Minnesota state legislator and businessman
 Samuel  A. Rask (1874-1959), Minnesota state senator and businessman

References

External links
City of Blooming Prairie, MN – Official Website
Blooming Prairie Schools site

Cities in Minnesota
Cities in Steele County, Minnesota
Cities in Dodge County, Minnesota
Rochester metropolitan area, Minnesota